Kabelo Seakanyeng (born 25 June 1993) is a Motswana footballer who plays as a midfielder for Olympique Club de Khouribga.

Club career
Seakanyeng was named the best player of the 2013–14 Botswana Premier League.

International career
Seakanyeng scored goals in Botswana's first two group stage matches at the 2018 COSAFA Cup.

Career statistics

Club

Notes

International

International goals
Scores and results list Botswana's goal tally first.

Honours

Individual
Mascom Top 8 Cup Player of the Tournament: 2014

References

1993 births
Living people
Botswana footballers
Botswana expatriate footballers
Botswana international footballers
Association football midfielders
Botswana Defence Force XI F.C. players
Gaborone United S.C. players
Expatriate soccer players in South Africa
Botswana expatriate sportspeople in South Africa
TS Galaxy F.C. players